The Ghana Ports and Harbours Authority (GPHA) is the national port authority of Ghana. Between the 16th and 18th centuries foreign trade in the then Gold Coast was undertaken from about 40 landing points scattered around the Gold Coast. By the 1900s these had converged to six main ports of trade. From 1920 to the 1940s the transport witnessed its first revolution in the road and rail network which culminated in the construction of the Takoradi Port. Further road expansion and shifts in the direction of trade in the post independence era led to the construction of the Ghana's second port “Tema Port]], and Port of Tema, and the Fishing Harbour at Tema. GPHA main offices are in Sekondi-Takoradi, and Tema.

Ports and Harbours
The Takoradi Harbour and Tema Harbour and ports serves Sekondi-Takoradi and Tema's role as manufacturing centers, and handles cargo in transshipment to and from bordering countries north of Ghana. The Golden Jubilee Terminal is a recently opened facility of the Tema port.

Fishing Harbour at Tema
The Fishing Harbour at Tema is a separate port facility at Tema. It is a commercial and industrial fishing port composed of four main areas, Inner Harbour, Outer Harbour, Canoe Basin and Commercial Area. The harbour handles the catch from commercial deep-sea fishing and canoe fishing.

See also
Takoradi Harbour
Tema Harbour
Transport in Ghana
Harbor
Port authority
Port operator

References

External links
 Ghana Maritime official page
 Ghana Ports and Harbours Authority official page
 Maritime Organisation of West and Central Africa, Ghana
 OT Africa Online, Port of Tema
 Ghana Shippers' Council, Projects

Government of Ghana
Transport organisations based in Ghana
Port authorities
Ports and harbours in Africa
 
Sekondi-Takoradi
Tema
Water transport in Ghana